Vyacheslav Bobrov (born 19 September 1992) is a Ukrainian basketball player for BC Budivelnyk of the European North Basketball League and the Champions League.. He also plays for the Ukrainian national team.

Professional career
During the 2019–20 season, Bobrov averaged 7.4 points and 3.2 rebounds per game in the Liga ACB. On 30 May 2020 he signed a two-year extension with Fuenlabrada.

Bobrov subsequently joined BC Dnipro of the Ukrainian Basketball Super League. He averaged 9.4 points, 5.7 rebounds, and 1.0 assist per game during the 2021–22 season.

On 28 February 2022, Bobrov signed with Nanterre 92 of the LNB Pro A.

On August 1, 2022, he has signed with BC Budivelnyk of the European North Basketball League.

National team career
Bobrov participated at the EuroBasket in 2017 and 2022.

References

External links
 ACB.com profile

1992 births
Living people
Baloncesto Fuenlabrada players
BC Azovmash players
BC Budivelnyk players
BC Kyiv players
BC Pieno žvaigždės players
Centers (basketball)
CSU Pitești players
Gipuzkoa Basket players
Liga ACB players
Nanterre 92 players
Power forwards (basketball)
Small forwards
Sportspeople from Donetsk
UJAP Quimper 29 players
Ukrainian expatriate basketball people in France
Ukrainian expatriate basketball people in Lithuania
Ukrainian expatriate sportspeople in Romania
Ukrainian expatriate basketball people in Spain
Ukrainian men's basketball players